The 1885 Denbighshire by-election was a parliamentary by-election held for the House of Commons constituency of Denbighshire in Wales on 27 May 1885.

Vacancy
The by-election was caused by the death of the sitting Conservative MP, Watkin Williams-Wynn on 9 May 1885.

Candidates
The only candidate who nominated was Herbert Williams-Wynn, the nephew and son in law of Watkin Williams-Wynn

Results

References

1885 elections in the United Kingdom
By-elections to the Parliament of the United Kingdom in Welsh constituencies
1885 in Wales
1880s elections in Wales
May 1885 events
History of Denbighshire